"Peter's Two Dads" is the tenth episode in the fifth season of the American animated television series Family Guy. It originally aired on the Fox network in the United States on February 11, 2007. The plot follows Peter traveling to Ireland to find his biological father, after he accidentally kills his stepfather at his daughter's birthday party. Meanwhile, after Lois spanks him, Stewie becomes fascinated with it and goes to great lengths to have her hit him again.

The episode was written by Danny Smith and directed by Cyndi Tang, with Greg Lovell as co-director. It received mostly positive reviews from critics for its storyline and many cultural references. According to Nielsen ratings, it was viewed in 7.97 million homes in its original airing. The episode featured guest performances by Dan Conroy, Phyllis Diller, Charles Durning and Fred Tatasciore, along with several recurring guest voice actors for the series. It was nominated for a Primetime Emmy Award for Outstanding Original Music and Lyrics, for the episode's song entitled "Drunken Irish Dad", at the 59th Primetime Creative Arts Emmy Awards.

Plot
Meg asks Lois and Peter if she can have a birthday party, preferably a teenager-type party with a band playing at her house. Unfortunately, Peter and Lois do not even know how old Meg is going to be. They have bought sixteen candles, but Meg overreacts when telling them that she is turning seventeen years old, and calls them jerks. Meg notices that her birthday party is kiddie-type, with games such as Pin the Tail on the Donkey.

At the party, Peter dresses up as "Pee Pants the Inebriated Hobo Clown", "an adorable tramp who wears found clothing and eats out of your garbage can". Peter then tells Meg that he got her a scarf for her birthday. Meg declines, while Peter then says he got her "a dozen scarves" which Peter then proceeds to regurgitate as one long scarf, as he has actually tied and swallowed them (which Lois says he was not supposed to do). This causes him to cough and vomit. Peter hands Meg the long scarf from his tongue, but Meg refuses to hold it. Peter then urges Meg to hold them, and then asks if his long johns are tied to the end of them. When Meg says they are not, Peter then says "Oh, god" and regurgitates them as well, and then crouches in pain following the ordeal. Meg asks Lois if she can open her gifts, and Meg notices Stewie opening most of them. Peter gets drunk, and attempts to ride a unicycle down the steps, but falls off and crushes his father, Francis, who later dies in the hospital from the accident. Just before Francis dies, he calls Peter "a fat stinking drunk".

Peter is disappointed since Francis did not care about him – so he gives up drinking and does crack instead. Brian notices this, and tells Peter that crack is not a good substitute for drinking. As a result, Peter sees a hypnotherapist (Bruce), who helps him discover that Francis was not his biological father. When Peter goes to his mom, Thelma Griffin, about it, she reveals that she had an affair with an Irish man named Mickey McFinnigan and that Mickey is Peter's biological father.

Brian and Peter travel to a village in Ireland to find Mickey, who they discover is the town drunk. At first horrified, Peter finds out it is considered an honorable position in Ireland by the locals. Mickey refuses to believe that Peter is his son and mocks him. Dejected, Peter laments he would only be able to convince him of the truth if he were a "fat stinking drunk", but then recalls Francis' last words to him, which gives him an idea.

In an attempt to persuade Mickey, Peter challenges him to a drinking contest, which Peter wins. Mickey finally believes that Peter is his son, feeling that nobody but a member of his own family could beat him in something like a drinking contest. Peter is excited to have formed a bond with his real father, and they and the bar patrons sing and dance to "Drunken Irish Dad".

Subplot
After discovering Stewie opening Meg's presents, Lois realises he is going through the "mine" phase. She later discovers him going through her jewelry, and when she tells him to stop and take everything off he snaps a pearl necklace to pieces so she spanks him. He runs off in fear and tears, but quickly realises that he actually enjoyed being hit and might be "one of those people" so he goes to great lengths in order for him to get spanked again. Lois gets annoyed at his antics but, not wanting to hurt her child again, refuses to punish him despite him begging her to. When Stewie hears himself begging Lois to rub dirt in his eyes and violate him with a wine bottle, he realises he has problems and stops.

Production
This episode marks the third appearance of Francis Griffin. As of now, episode writer and series co-executive producer Danny Smith has written all Family Guy episodes to date to feature Francis when he was alive. Show creator Seth MacFarlane comments that the episode came together and played great from start to finish. Prior to the making of the episode, there had been several different ideas and disagreements for Peter's father's appearance. MacFarlane comments that he had always pictured Peter's father to be a fat, drunk leprechaun. The negativity of Francis was becoming "dull to write for", hence the storyline of Peter finding his biological father. MacFarlane also mentions not having ideas to write for Kevin, Joe Swanson's son, who was mentioned in a later episode that he died in the war of Iraq (Stew-Roids). A deleted scene showed Peter pretending to quit drinking, but continuing quietly was one of several scenes that was removed from airing as it and the others were described by the producers to be "not going anywhere."

The scene with Peter in the hypnotherapist's office was censored for television; a portion of the scene, which sees hypnotherapist Bruce discuss Peter's genitals and reproductive organs, was cut out. When Peter comes to the realization that Francis is not his real father and when Stewie dreams about being tortured by Lois, a harp sound can be heard; MacFarlane comments that even small things like that take a lot of work to produce. The alcohol bottles being pushed by the airplane that Peter and Brian are traveling on were animated by computer, as is the taxi driving along the street. On the DVD commentary, MacFarlane notes that the scene would not have looked good without computer aid. He said it makes the animations seem more realistic than without a computer. The two men circling each other for fifty years and waiting for the other to throw the first punch was not broadcast for television.

In addition to the regular cast, actor Dan Conroy, actress Phyllis Diller, actor Charles Durning, and voice actor Fred Tatasciore guest starred in the episode. Recurring guest voice actors Alex Breckenridge, Chris Cox, writer Danny Smith, writer Alec Sulkin and writer John Viener made minor appearances.

Cultural references
Stewie draws a picture of David Tua on the wall to try to get Lois to hit him. It also mocks the main character's decisions in Pet Sematary when Peter buried Francis' body at the same cemetery to resurrect him, but decided against it after Francis, as a zombie, jumped out of the grave in a jump scare, remarking "Okay, maybe I'll bury him in a regular cemetery." Peter briefly transforms into Wonder Woman after discovering his biological father is not Francis: this is a reference to Wonder Woman, and although the show could not receive rights to reproduce the original music, the scene was still broadcast. Before Peter and Brian leave to Ireland, Meg tells Peter she loves him, in which he replies, "That'll do, pig, that'll do", which is a reference to the film Babe.
When Francis showed up as a ghost along with Yoda and Obi-Wan Kenobi, Hayden Christensen (who played Anakin Skywalker in the Star Wars prequel trilogy) also appears and says "And I'm Hayden Christensen!", as a reference to the ending of the 2004 remastered DVD release of Return of the Jedi. The song Chris and Herbert sing at the party and up in a tree is "Friends and Lovers" by Gloria Loring and Carl Anderson.

Reception
In a significant decrease from the previous week, the episode was viewed in 7.97 million homes in its original airing, according to Nielsen ratings. The episode also acquired a 2.8 rating in the 18–49 demographic, being slightly edged out by The Simpsons, while still winning over American Dad!.

A reviewer from Boxxet commented that "when I checked the schedule and saw the title of this episode was 'Peter's Two Dads', I was a little torn. First, the Peter-centric episodes generally have a much higher chance of going off the rails," following on to comment that "the episode that we did see still left me with something of a mixed reaction." concluding with a positive comment that the episode "was well constructed."

IGN's Ahsan Haque noted that "despite a couple of underdeveloped plotlines and an overabundance of offensive and uncomfortable jokes, this week's episode of Family Guy somehow manages to succeed with just enough truly hilarious moments and actual story elements." MacFarlane has said that this is one of his favorite episodes, alongside "PTV" and "Road to Rhode Island."

References

External links

Family Guy (season 5) episodes
2007 American television episodes
Television episodes set in the Republic of Ireland
Television episodes about birthdays

sv:Family Guy#Mickey McFinnigan